Case Closed: The  Phantom of Baker Street, known as  in Japan, is the sixth Case Closed feature film, released in Japan on April 20, 2002. The Phantom of Baker Street is the first film in the series written by  Hisashi Nozawa. This was the last of the Case Closed films done in cel animation. It was released on February 16, 2010, in America on DVD. This film brought 3.4 billion yen in the box office. The story features several characters from and references to the Sherlock Holmes series, which Detective Conan is heavily inspired by, and Jack the Ripper.

Plot
Child prodigy Hiroki Sawada—who, by the age of ten, is already a MIT grad student and has developed a DNA Tracker software—has been under the guardianship of Thomas Schindler, CEO of the software giant Schindler, Inc., since his mother died. One night, in a heavily guarded room at the top of the Schindler building where Hiroki lives, he finishes an artificial intelligence system, Noah's Ark, and sends the software through the telephone lines. The guards become suspicious when he does not respond. They bust open the door, but discover that Hiroki has disappeared, apparently having leapt off the building.

Two years later, at the Beika City Hall, Schindler, Inc., holds a demonstration of an immersive virtual reality game called Cocoon. Conan, Richard, Rachel and the Detective Boys (including Haibara Ai) are attending the demonstration, but cannot participate without special badges, which have been allocated to children associated with the game's investors and prominent socialites such as Serena. Dr. Agasa and Booker Kudo, who have been involved in the development of the game's setting, attend the event. Agasa gives Conan a badge, while the other Junior Detective kids trade Premium Golden Yaiba Cards for badges.

When security discovers that Kashimura, a top employee of Schindler, Inc., has been killed. Booker and Conan rush to investigate. Discovering that  Kashimura's keyboard has blood stains on three of the keys (R, T, and J), Conan decides to participate in the demonstration, hoping that the game would lead him to an answer. Booker reasons out that J-T-R stands for "Jack the Ripper".

When the demonstration begins, Hiroki's artificial intelligence system, Noah's Ark, announces it has taken control, but it tells the audience that if none of the fifty people are able to survive the game, it will kill the kids in reality using a large electromagnetic burst. The kids must choose one of five types of games while the audience watch helplessly, unable to shut the game down. Conan and the Junior Detectives choose the fifth, a re-creation 19th century London set in the world of Sherlock Holmes. Conan and his friends track down 221B Baker Street, only to find that Sherlock Holmes and Dr. Watson are at Dartmoor. Since Holmes cannot help, the kids find Sebastian Moran and Professor Moriarty. Moriarty tells Conan that he trained Jack the Ripper when Jack was a street urchin. The professor gives the children a clue about the next victim, who turns out to be Irene Adler, Holmes's only love. Some of the events lead to more kids being eliminated from the game, including the Junior Detectives. Meanwhile, in the real world, Booker investigates the case and reveals that Kashimura's murderer is the company's president, Thomas Schindler, who Hiroki had discovered was a descendant of the original Jack the Ripper.

Eventually only three are left: Conan, Rachel, and another child named Hideki Moroboshi. They follow Jack the Ripper to a train and reveals Jack among the passengers. However, Jack captures Rachel and sets the train on a runaway course. After being unable to stop the train, Conan and Hideki confront Jack on top of the train where he has tied himself to Rachel. Hoping that Conan can figure out the situation, Rachel sacrifices herself by jumping off the train and into a ravine, pulling Jack with her. As Conan begins to lose hope, Sherlock Holmes appears and gives Conan some useful advice that eventually helps Conan and Hideki survive the game when the train crashes into the station.
After winning the game, Conan reveals that Hideki is actually Hiroki, who has manifested himself as Noah's Ark. In a private conversation, Hiroki says he was satisfied with the outcome, as he was hoping the kids can paint a brighter future than their parents, and that he was happy he could also participate as a player in the game. He releases the children from the game and then erases himself.

Cast

Music
The film's theme song is "Everlasting" by B'z. It was released on July 2, 2002, on their album, Green.

The official soundtrack was released on April 17, 2002. It costs ¥3059 including tax.

Home media

VHS
The VHS of the film was released on April 9, 2003. It was discontinued soon after 2006 as it was switched to DVD.

Region 2 DVD
The Region 2 DVD was released on December 18, 2002. The DVD includes the film in widescreen and the trailer.

Region 1 DVD
The Region 1 DVD was released on February 16, 2010, by FUNimation Entertainment. The DVD includes the film with both English dub and Japanese dub with English subtitles.

Reception
In addition to winning third place in the film series request project held on the official website in 2006, Aoyama commented that it was his mother's favorite film. In addition, it won the second place in the popularity poll of 19 successive films held in 2016.

Carlo Santos of Anime News Network commended the film's departure from the series' cinematic formula with its "picturesque" London setting and double mystery alongside the usual "action-packed ending", but felt it was hampered by poorly paced execution, "inconsistent production values", and no utilization of Sherlock Homes himself, calling it "an awkwardly stretched-out episode instead of a feature film, and Holmes doesn't even show up to help."

Box office results 
The final box office revenue of this work was 3.4 billion yen, exceeding 3 billion for the first time, and since it was the second largest Japanese film in 2002, Suwa is said to be a monument. This record wasn't broken until it was updated to 3.5 billion yen in the 13th film, The Raven Chaser.

References

External links 
 
 

2002 anime films
Animated films set in London
Animated films set in Tokyo
Phantom of Baker Street
Films about Jack the Ripper
Films directed by Kenji Kodama
Films set in 1888
Funimation
TMS Entertainment
Toho animated films
Virtual reality in fiction